Computational methods can study protein sequences to identify regions with low complexity, which can have particular properties regarding their function and structure.

For a comprehensive review on the various methods and tools, see.

In addition, a web meta-server named PLAtform of TOols for LOw COmplexity (PlaToLoCo) has been developed, for visualization and annotation of low complexity regions in proteins. PlaToLoCo integrates and collects the output of five different state-of-the-art tools for discovering LCRs and provides functional annotations such as domain detection, transmembrane segment prediction, and calculation of amino acid frequencies. Furthermore, the union or intersection of the results of the search on a query sequence can be obtained.

A Neural Network webserver, named LCR-hound has been developed to predict the function of prokaryotic and eukaryotic LCRs, based on their amino acid or di-amino acid content.

References 

Proteomics
Lists of software